In geology, cyclothems are alternating stratigraphic sequences of marine and non-marine sediments, sometimes interbedded with coal seams.  Historically, the term was defined by the European coal geologists who worked in coal basins formed during the Carboniferous and earliest Permian periods. The cyclothems consist of repeated sequences, each typically several meters thick, of sandstone resting upon an erosional surface, passing upwards to pelites (finer-grained than sandstone) and topped by coal.

Depositional sequences have been thoroughly studied by oil geologists using geophysical profiles of continental and marine basins. A general theory of basin-scale deposition has been formalized under the name of sequence stratigraphy.

Some cyclothems might have formed as a result of marine regressions and transgressions related to growth and decay of ice sheets, respectively, as the Carboniferous was a time of widespread glaciation in the southern hemisphere. A more general interpretation of sequences invokes Milankovitch cycles.

References

External links 
Jacobson, R. J. (2000) Depositional History of the Pennsylvanian Rocks in Illinois. Geonote 2. Illinois State Geological Survey, Champaign, Illinois.

Carboniferous
Sedimentology
Sedimentary rocks